Pissalat (or pissala) is a condiment originating from the Nice region of France. The name comes from peis salat in Niçard and means "salted fish". It is made from anchovy puree flavoured with cloves, thyme, bay leaf and black pepper mixed with olive oil.  Pissalat is used for flavouring hors d'oeuvres, fish, cold meats and, especially, the local specialty, pissaladière.

Etymology 
The word ‘pissala’ (in Nissard) or pissalat (in French) is composed of the old Provençal word “peis” for "fish", and sala, the past participle of salar, which corresponds to the French "saler" (to salt). Together, they describe  "preserves of small crushed and salted fish" or, similarly, "a piquant sauce made from the maceration of salted fish".

History 
The pissalat is similar to the siqqu, from the Mesopotamian Culinary Treatise of the 2nd millennium BC. J.-C. (c. 1700 BC) or with garum (juice or sauce, in Latin, from Roman antiquity). Since the time of ancient Rome, garum has been produced (with many variants) throughout the Mediterranean basin. It is a sauce obtained by the maceration in salt of heads and intestines of mackerel, sardines, anchovies and aromatic plants. The sauce thus obtained, passed through a fine sieve, was recovered with a ladle, and was preserved in olive oil.

The manufacture of pissalat was a centuries-old local industry in the Nice-Côte d'Azur region, where the salting of sardines and anchovies employed roughly a dozen families at the beginning of the 19th century. The Niçois writer, Louis Roubaudi, notes in his 1843 book Nice and its surroundings: "The pissalat is very suitable for reviving the appetite when it is seasoned with olive oil, vinegar and salted olives. » 

The sauce largely disappeared from commerce during the Second World War, and exists today only in the form of local traditional artisanal and family production (it is often replaced by salted anchovies or anchovy purée), in particular for the preparation of Pissaladière.

Recipe 
The pissalat sauce is traditionally made from a mixture of anchovies, sardines, or poutine. These ingredients are pounded in a mortar, then macerated-fermented for several months in a large Provençal terracotta terrine with a brine of salt, pepper, olive oil, spices and herbs, thyme, bay leaf, cinnamon, and ground cloves (for preservation by salting). 

The mixture is then stored in a cool place and stirred daily so as to quickly form a paste. The oil that rises to the surface must be skimmed every week. The resulting paste is passed through a fine sieve after one month. The pissalat can then be kept for some time in glass jars, covered with olive oil.

It can be eaten on slices of bread and accompany soups, vegetables, salads, meats or other dishes of Provençal cuisine.

Confrerie 
Confrérie des chevaliers du pissalat d'Antibes-Juan-les-Pins.

See also 
 Prahok
 Larousse Gastronomique
 List of fish sauces

References

Fish sauces
French cuisine
Occitan cuisine
Umami enhancers
Food paste
Anchovy dishes